Jens Marcussen (20 May 1926 – 29 January 2007) was a Norwegian politician for the Progress Party.

Before the Progress Party was founded, Marcussen was a prominent member of the Conservative Party, being a member of the national party board in 1972–1975. In 1976 he became first vice chairman for his new party.

He was born in Dypvåg and elected to the Norwegian Parliament from Rogaland in 1981, and was elected in 1989 from Aust-Agder.

Marcussen was a member of Dypvåg municipality council in the periods 1951–1955, 1955–1959 and 1959–1960. He then held various positions in its successor municipality Tvedestrand, serving as deputy mayor in 1965–1966 and mayor in 1967–1971. He was also a member of Vest-Agder county council, in 1967–1971, 1975–1979 and 1979–1983.

References

1926 births
2007 deaths
Mayors of places in Aust-Agder
Members of the Storting
Conservative Party (Norway) politicians
Progress Party (Norway) politicians
Place of death missing
20th-century Norwegian politicians